Nicole Humbert, née Rieger (born 5 February 1972 in Landau) is a retired German pole vaulter.

Her personal best is 4.51 metres, achieved in July 2001 in Salamanca. This ranks her seventh among German pole vaulters, behind Annika Becker, Yvonne Buschbaum, Carolin Hingst, Anastasija Reiberger, Silke Spiegelburg and Julia Hütter. However, with 4.56 metres Humbert has a better personal best indoor.

Achievements

References

External links

1972 births
Living people
German female pole vaulters
Athletes (track and field) at the 2000 Summer Olympics
Olympic athletes of Germany
European Athletics Championships medalists
People from Landau
Sportspeople from Rhineland-Palatinate